Conny Hamann [born ] is a former Danish team handball player and Olympic champion. She received a gold medal with the Danish national team at the 1996 Summer Olympics in Atlanta.

References

External links

1969 births
Living people
Danish female handball players
Olympic gold medalists for Denmark
Handball players at the 1996 Summer Olympics
Olympic medalists in handball
Medalists at the 1996 Summer Olympics